The 1928 San Jose State Spartans football team represented State Teachers College at San Jose during the 1928 college football season.

San Jose State competed in the last year of the California Coast Conference (CCC). They had been a member since 1922, and would move to the Far Western Conference (FWC) in 1929. The team was led by fifth-year head coach Ernesto R. Knollin, and they played home games at Spartan Field in San Jose, California. The team finished the season with a record of six wins, two losses and one tie (6–2–1, 6–2 CCC). The Spartans outscored their opponents 123–64 for the season.

The CCC championship game was a rematch of the Spartans earlier loss vs. San Mateo Junior College. In the rematch, San Jose State tied San Mateo 21–21.

Schedule

Notes

References

San Jose State
San Jose State Spartans football seasons
California Coast Conference football champion seasons
San Jose State Spartans football